Anatoly Ivanovich Belyaev (1906–1967) founded the school of metallurgy of light non-ferrous metals and semi-conducting materials. He was Professor of Moscow Institute of Steel and Alloys. He was head of the department of metallurgy of light metals in the Moscow Institute of Non-ferrous Metals and Gold from 1943 to 1963.
From 1962 to 1967 he was organizer and head of the chair for producing pure metals and semi-conducting materials in MISIS.

Basic studies
Physico-chemical properties of fused electrolytes, in particular, chloride melts and their role in melting aluminum alloys
Electrolytic aluminum and magnesium production,
Theory of anode effect occurrence;
Processes of electrolysis  production of primary aluminum using lithium additives in the form of lithium fluoride
Problems in the high-purity aluminum production,
Elaboration of the method to remove impurities from aluminum by means of transport reactions  through subhalogenides,
Aluminum electric refining in the high-purity metal production, surface phenomena in fused salts,
Production processes of particularly pure metals and semi-conducting materials,
Metallurgy of aluminum, magnesium, beryllium, lithium, zirconium, etc.
Designed fluxing material compositions are applied in production.

Publications
"Non-ferrous metals", 1957, No. 9. Chu Ianiang, Belayev A. I.
"Proceedings of metallurgists. Non-ferrous metallurgy", 1959, No. 2.
"Metallurgy of light metals. General course" (Higher school manual). Metallurgizdat, 1940, 1944, 1949, 1954, 1962 (6 publications)
"Surface phenomena in metallurgical processes". Metallurgizdat, 1952.
"Physico-chemical principles in purification of metals and semi-conducting materials". Publishing House of MISiS, 1965.
"Physical chemistry of fused salts". Metallurgizdat, 1957.
"Electrolytic aluminum production". Metallurgizdat, 1941.
"Electrometallurgy of aluminum". Metallurgizdat, 1953.
"Monovalent aluminum in metallurgical processes"
"Pure aluminum production"
"Metallurgy of pure metals and semi-conductors", together with L.A. Firsanova and  E.A. Zhemchuzhina.

References

1906 births
1967 deaths
Russian metallurgists